Marama is a town and a locality in the Australian state of South Australia located in the state's south-east about  east of the state capital of Adelaide and about  east of the municipal seat of Karoonda.

The government town of Marama was proclaimed on 23 August 1917 on land in the cadastral unit of the Hundred of Molineux located to the immediate south of the Marama Railway Station. The town was named after the railway station which was a stop on the now-closed Peebinga railway line and whose name is derived from an aboriginal word mean "black duck". The locality 's boundaries were created on 11 November 1999 and includes the site of the government town of Marama which is located in its approximate centre.

The town was established as a station on the Peebinga railway line (now closed) and is now on the Karoonda to Lameroo road.  There is a town hall, post office and an automated telephone exchange.

The 2016 Australian census which was conducted in August 2016 reports that Marama had a population of 62 people.

Marama is located within the federal division of Barker, the state electoral district of Hammond and the local government area of the District Council of Karoonda East Murray.

References

Towns in South Australia